Momme Andresen (17 October 1857 - 12 January 1951) was a Danish-German industrial research chemist. His main area of work was to formulate better developers and fixers for black-and-white photographs.

Biography
Andresen attended a Volksschule (a local state school) in Niebüll, Schleswig-Holstein, near his birthplace. He studied chemistry at the Technische Hochschule Dresden under Rudolf Schmitt. After doctoral studies at the University of Jena, he returned to Dresden to work as Schmitt's assistant.

His first independent scientific work was to determine the structure of the dyestuff safranin, for the German chemical company Cassella. Around that time, he also discovered "Andresen's acid". He worked for some years in Buffalo, New York. In 1887, he took employment at Aktien-Gesellschaft für Anilinfabrikation (modern AGFA) in Berlin as a dyestuff chemist.

He was already a keen amateur photographer. He had used, and was dissatisfied with, developers based on hydroquinone (which had been introduced in 1880). In 1889, AGFA set up a photographic research unit in Berlin, with Andresen as its head. His goal was to devise photographic developers which could be stored as stable liquid concentrates which could be diluted for use when needed, rather than having to be made up from several ingredients on the spot. He worked on formulations based on p-phenylenediamine and p-aminophenol, among other aromatic amines. He discovered a useful formulation based on p-aminophenol. On 27 January 1891, a German patent application describing and claiming it was filed. That application was granted as German patent DE 60,174. Corresponding patents were granted in other countries, including FR 211,243, GB 1,736/1891 and US 477,486. AGFA commercialised the formulation under the trade name Rodinal. Rodinal was still in use more than a century after its invention.

In 1892. he turned his attention to dry plate (gelatin process) photography. That process had been invented in 1871, and commercialised in 1879. It had problems; including inconsistent results and halation (German: Lichthof). In 1895, he had a part in devising improvements to the process which led to AGFA commercialising a product in 1898 which both gave better results and was quicker to develop than anything used before. It was especially useful in X-ray photography.

In 1940, the University of Jena awarded him an honorary doctorate.

He wrote at least one poem in his native North Frisian dialect.

Publications
 .
 
 
 
 
 Das latente Lichtbild, seine Entstehung und Entwicklung. Knapp, Halle (1913)
 Über lichthoffreie und farbenempfindliche Platten. Agfa, Berlin (1916)
 Über photographische Entwickler. Agfa, Berlin (undated)
 Über photographische Hilfsmittel im Negativ- und Positiv-Prozess. Agfa, Berlin (undated)
 Winke für die Blitzlicht-Photographie. Agfa, Berlin (undated)
 Agfa Photo-Handbuch. I. G. Farbenindustrie AG, Berlin (1930)

Notes

References

Further reading
 
 

1857 births
People from Nordfriesland
Danish chemists
19th-century Danish inventors
19th-century German chemists
19th-century German inventors
1951 deaths
Agfa
20th-century German chemists